Tennis enjoys a considerable following in India, although it is limited to urban areas but still it is counted among the most popular sports in India. India has produced a number of tennis players, who have achieved international recognition and have made their presence in some of the top tennis tournaments and grand slams. All India Tennis Association (AITA) established in 1920, is the governing body of tennis in India and is a member of the Asian Tennis Federation. India Davis Cup team is the most successful team of Asia in Davis Cup, who has finished as runners-up 3 times.

History
Tennis has been a popular sport in India since around the 1880s when the British Army and Civilian Officers brought the game to India. Soon after regular tournaments like the 'Punjab Lawn tennis Championship' at Lahore (Now in Pakistan) (1885); 'Bengal Lawn Tennis Championship' at Calcutta (now Kolkata) (1887) and the 'All India Tennis Championships' at Allahabad (1910) were organised. In the history of major tournaments, India has already beaten among others France, Romania, Holland, Belgium, Spain and Greece in Davis Cup ties (1921 to 1929).

The history of tennis in India goes back a long way. In the 1880s, the British introduced the game of tennis in India during the colonial rule and soon it started gaining momentum. BK Nehru in 1905 and Sardar Nihal Singh in 1908 were later joined by M Saleem, Fayzee brothers and Jagat Mohan Lal who made it to last 16 stages at the Wimbledon. Ghaus Mohammad was the first Indian to reach the quarterfinals at Wimbledon in 1939 where he lost to American champion Bobby Riggs.

According to the All India Tennis Association, in Davis Cup ties between 1921 and 1929, India beat, among others, France, Romania, Holland, Belgium, Spain and Greece. Top Indian players like Saleem, Fayzee brothers, Cotah Ramaswamy and Krishna Prasad beat a large number of ranked European players and teams to bring glory to the nation.

In the 1960s, the sport witnessed a golden era. Ramanathan Krishnan earned his highest seeding – No. 4 in Wimbledon in 1962. In the Davis Cup, India repeatedly became the Zonal Champions. Ramanathan Krishnan, along with Premjit Lall, SP Misra, Jaidip Mukerjea and RK Khanna as the non-playing captain, steered India to the Cup finals in 1966. They lost the Cup but not before Krishnan and Mukerjea beat Newcombe and Tony Roche, the Wimbledon champions, (1965) in doubles.

In the 1970s, Vijay Amritraj burst onto the scene. With teammates Sashi Menon, Jasjit Singh and brother Anand Amritraj, Vijay took India to World Cup Finals for the second time in 1974. Vijay also made it to the quarterfinals of US Open in 1973 and 1981; and Wimbledon in 1973 and 1974. Ramesh Krishnan, the son of Ramanathan Krishnan, won the junior Wimbledon championship and junior French Open title in 1979 and was ranked number 1 junior in the world. He made it to the quarterfinals at Wimbledon (1986) and US Open (twice).

The 1990s saw the rise of Leander Paes who won the bronze medal at the 1996 Summer Olympics. In 1997, Mahesh Bhupati became India's first ever grand slam winner when he won the mixed doubles at French Open. Paes partnered with Bhupati to reach the finals of all four grand slams in 1999, winning two. In the 2000s and 2010s, playing separately or together, Paes and Bhupati won several grand slam doubles and mixed doubles tournaments.

The 2000s saw India's first WTA tournament winner Sania Mirza. Mirza also won a number of grand slam titles in doubles in the late 2000s and 2010s.

India's last grand slam win came in 2017 when Rohan Bopanna won the mixed doubles title at French Open. At the end of 2010s, Prajnesh Gunneswaran was the only Indian men's singles player in the top 100.
In 2021 Ankita Raina became the 2nd woman from India to win a WTA title and enter into top 100 doubles rankings.

Grand Slam Finals
In 1997, India won their first Grand Slam title at the French open, in the Mixed Doubles. Since then Indians have won Grand Slam titles in the Mixed Doubles, Men's Doubles, Women's Doubles besides Girls' Doubles events. No Indian has so far won a Grand Slam Singles title in the Men's or Women's category.

Mixed doubles

Men's doubles

Women's doubles

Total medals won by Indian Tennis players in Major tournaments

Notable Performance at Summer Olympics

See also
 All India Tennis Association
 India Davis Cup team
  India Fed Cup team
 India at the Hopman Cup

References